The Perm Tchaikovsky Opera and Ballet Theatre is an opera and ballet theatre in the city of Perm in Russia. It is one of the oldest theatres in the country, and it has remained a major musical centre during its history, in which many significant art events have taken place. Its ballet troupe is one of the most popular in Russia.

The theatre is often named "Tchaikovsky's House", and all stage works of Pyotr Ilyich Tchaikovsky, who was born in the region, are presented in its repertoire: 10 operas and 3 ballets. Festivals of Tchaikovsky's works were notable cultural events of the country.

History

The theatre was inaugurated on 24 November 1870 with the premiere performance being Mikhail Glinka's A Life for the Tsar. The building was constructed from 1874 to 1879, after which the first performance took place in the winter of 1879/1880. 

A new epoch in the history of the theatre started in 1896. It received the patronage of the city parliament, which decided to finance the theatre and the opera troupe from the city budget. A board of directors was elected for managing the theatre and inviting the artists. The first season after the end of the Civil War opened on 20 August 1921.

During World War II, when the Leningrad State Academic Theatre of Opera and Ballet evacuated its personnel to the city, its performances were given in the Perm theatre. The artists from Leningrad had worked in Perm for three winters and two summers.

In 1956, the Perm theatre was renamed in honor of Pyotr Ilyich Tchaikovsky and given Academy status in 1969.

Awards
The artists of the theatre have got the Golden Mask Award for many performances:

 1996: Don Pasquale for Best Actor and Best Actress
 1998: The Queen of Spades for Best Set Design
 2004: Ballet Imperial for Best Ballet
 2009: L'Orfeo for Best Set Design and Best Stage Direction
 2010: One Day in the Life of Ivan Denisovich for Best Conductor's Work
 2012: To See The Music Special Awards of Musical Theatre Jury
 2013: Così fan tutte for Best Opera Director
 2013: Medeamaterial for Best Opera Actress

Opera
Many opera premieres in Russia were given in this theatre. The theatre held the first festival in the 20th Century of the Russian composer Sergei Prokofiev's work, where it opened with a two-evening version of the opera War and Peace.

Ballet
There is a good tradition of collaboration with directors and choreographers from Germany, United States, Spain, and Switzerland on the Perm stage. Due to long-term projects between Russia and United States in collaboration with The George Balanchine Foundation and The Jerome Robbins Foundation, the repertoire of the theatre gets many masterpieces of the most distinguished choreographers of the 20th century. For many decades the theatre has been the launch site for many artists who are famous far away from Russia.

Events
Arabesque is a ballet competition headed by Vladimir Vasiliev, which has taken place in Perm since 1990. More than 650 young ballet artists from Russia, former republics of the USSR, Austria, Argentina, Bulgaria, Belarus, China, Croatia, Egypt, Ireland, Japan, Mexico, Mongolia, Slovenia, South Korea, Turkey, United States and Venezuela have participated in it.

International festivals known as the "Diaghilev Seasons: Perm-Petersburg-Paris" have become some of the most visible events in the cultural life of Russia. The festival has taken place in the theatre every two years since 2003.

Concert tours
The ballet troupe performs abroad under the name of The Tchaikovsky Ballet. Promotion of the opera troupe in the United States began with a performance of Mazeppa in Carnegie Hall in January 2008 using the name The Tchaikovsky Theatre.

Arts management

 Teodor Currentzis – art director
 Marc de Mauny – general manager
 Galina Polushkina – executive director
 Valery Platonov – general conductor
 Alexey Miroshnichenko – general ballet master
 Vitaly Polonsky – general choirmaster

Building
Auditorium: 972 seats
Orchestra pit: 50 seats
Stage: height 21.5 m, width 18 m, depth 14 m
Proscenium arch: height 8.5 m, width 12 m

Gallery

References

External links

 The official site in English
 The official blog (in Russian)

1870 establishments in the Russian Empire
Theatres in Perm, Russia
Opera houses in Russia
Russian ballet
Theatres completed in 1879
Music venues completed in 1879